Təsi (also, Tasy and Tesi) is a village and municipality in the Gobustan Rayon of Azerbaijan with a population of 340.

References 

Populated places in Gobustan District